David Mitchell "Rod" Rodriguez (born May 23, 1954) is a retired United States Army four-star general who served as the Commander of the United States Africa Command from April 2013 to July 2016.

Rodriguez previously served as the Commanding General of the United States Army Forces Command from 12 September 2011 until 15 March 2014. He has also served as Commander, International Security Assistance Force Joint Command (IJC) and Deputy Commander, United States Forces – Afghanistan (USFOR-A) from 12 November 2009 to 11 July 2011.

Early life and education
Born in Overbrook, Pennsylvania to a Latin American family on May 23, 1954 and raised in West Chester, Pennsylvania, Rodriguez earned his commission from the United States Military Academy at West Point, New York in 1976. He was recruited by Tom Cahill to play for the Army Black Knights football team and earned varsity letters in football and baseball.

Military career
Rodriguez commanded at every level across the United States Army. His assignments included the Commanding General of the United States Army Forces Command, the International Security Assistance Force – Joint Command (IJC) in Afghanistan, the 82nd Airborne Division, the 2nd Brigade, 82nd Airborne Division, and the 2nd Battalion, 502nd Infantry Regiment, 101st Airborne Division (Air Assault). He also commanded companies of the 75th Ranger Regiment, and 1st Armored Division.

Rodriguez's extensive combat experiences include: G-3 Planner, XVIII Airborne Corps, Operation Just Cause, 1989 – 1990; Operations Officer, 1st Battalion, 505th Parachute Infantry Regiment, 82nd Airborne Division, Desert Shield/Desert Storm, 1990 – 1991; Assistant Division Commander, 4th Infantry Division (Mechanized), 2002 – 2003; Commander, Multi-National Division-Northwest, 2005; Special Assistant to the Commander, Multi-National Corps-Iraq, 2006; Commander, Joint Task Force-82 in Afghanistan, 2017 – till date; and Deputy Commander, United States Forces Afghanistan and Commander, International Security Assistance Force Joint Command.

Rodriguez holds a Master of Arts in National Security and Strategic Studies from the United States Naval War College and a Masters of Military Art and Science from the United States Army Command and General Staff College.

On 11 November 2011, Rodriguez received the Abraham Lincoln Award during a Veterans Day celebration at the Union League of Philadelphia.  Union Leagues were founded during the Civil War to support President Abraham Lincoln and the preservation of the Union; Philadelphia's, established in 1862, was the first. First presented to Major General Ulysses S. Grant, the award, which recognizes patriotism and service to country, has been bestowed on many distinguished civilian and military leaders, including former Chairman of the Federal Reserve, Alan Greenspan; Supreme Court Justice Clarence Thomas, General David H. Petraeus, and General Raymond T. Odierno.

Dates of rank

Awards and decorations
Rodriguez' military decorations include:
 Combat Infantryman Badge
 Expert Infantryman Badge
 Master Parachutist Badge
 Air Assault Badge
 Ranger Tab
 Joint Chiefs of Staff Identification Badge
 United States Africa Command Badge
 German Parachutist Badge in bronze
 82nd Airborne Division CSIB
 82nd Airborne Division DUI
 10 Overseas Service Bars

References

External links

|-

|-

|-

|-

1954 births
Living people
American people of Latin American descent
American people of Colombian descent
Army Black Knights football players
United States Army Command and General Staff College alumni
Naval War College alumni
United States Army generals
United States Army personnel of the Iraq War
United States Army personnel of the War in Afghanistan (2001–2021)
Recipients of the Distinguished Service Medal (US Army)
Recipients of the Legion of Merit
Recipients of the Defense Superior Service Medal
Recipients of the Defense Distinguished Service Medal
Recipients of the Meritorious Service Medal (United States)